Cally Palace, formerly known as Cally House, is an 18th-century country house  in the historical county of Kirkcudbrightshire in Dumfries and Galloway, south-west Scotland. The house is now a four star country house hotel and golf resort.

History
Cally House was commissioned by James Murray of Broughton, a grandson of the 5th Earl of Galloway and of the 9th Earl of Eglinton. Murray inherited the land on the death, in 1751, of his father, who had consulted William Adam about a new house at Cally in the 1740s, although nothing had then been done. While travelling in Rome in the mid-1750s, James Murray met the young architect Robert Mylne, who prepared the first plans while still abroad.

Murray later served as MP for the constituency of Wigtownshire from 1762 to 1768, as well as serving as Receiver General for Scotland in 1783. His grandson, Alexander Murray, made alterations to the house, including the portico by John Buonarotti Papworth. Further alterations were made in the 1850s, and the grounds were landscaped by William Dewar. 
In the later 19th century and early 20th century, the house was let out, and the last tenant was the Maharaja of Jind who lived there between 1930 and 1932.

Elizabeth Murray Usher, who inherited Cally in 1924, sold the house and grounds to the Forestry Commission in 1933. It was used as a residential school for evacuees from Glasgow during the Second World War, reopening in the later 1940s. The hotel has been owned by Trust House Forte and North West Hotels Ltd, and is now part of the McMillan Hotels group.

The house and grounds
 
The house is of significant architectural value, and is protected as a category A listed building. The grounds are included in the Inventory of Gardens and Designed Landscapes in Scotland, the national listing of significant gardens. The estate is also within the Gatehouse of Fleet conservation area and the Fleet Valley National Scenic Area. The remains of a 12th-century motte are located in the grounds.

References

External links 

 "Cally House (1942)", archive film about the wartime evacuation school at Cally House, from the National Library of Scotland Scottish Screen Archive

Hotels in Dumfries and Galloway
Houses in Dumfries and Galloway
Category A listed buildings in Dumfries and Galloway
Inventory of Gardens and Designed Landscapes
Gatehouse of Fleet
1763 establishments in Scotland
Houses completed in 1763
Hotels established in 1934
1934 establishments in Scotland
Listed hotels in Scotland